First Methodist Episcopal Church (now known as First United Methodist Church) is a historic church in Massillon, Ohio, United States, located at 301 Lincoln Way East. It is of stone and sandstone construction with a copper roof in the Richardsonian Romanesque style. The building was dedicated in June 1895 and was added to the U.S. National Register of Historic Places on August 22, 1985.

References

External links

First United Methodist Church of Massillon web site

Churches in Stark County, Ohio
National Register of Historic Places in Stark County, Ohio
Churches on the National Register of Historic Places in Ohio
Churches completed in 1899
19th-century Methodist church buildings in the United States
United Methodist churches in Ohio
Richardsonian Romanesque architecture in Ohio
Romanesque Revival church buildings in Ohio
Churches in Massillon, Ohio